Malta participated in the Eurovision Song Contest 2008 with the song "Vodka" written by Philip Vella and Gerard James Borg. The song was performed by Morena. The Maltese entry for the 2008 contest in Belgrade, Serbia was selected through the national final Malta Song for Europe 2008, organised by the Maltese broadcaster Public Broadcasting Services (PBS). The competition consisted of a semi-final round and a final, held on 24 and 26 January 2008, respectively, where "Vodka" performed by Morena eventually emerged as the winning entry after scoring the most points from a seven-member jury and a public televote.

Malta was drawn to compete in the second semi-final of the Eurovision Song Contest which took place on 22 May 2008. Performing during the show in position 16, "Vodka" was not announced among the 10 qualifying entries of the second semi-final and therefore did not qualify to compete in the final on 24 May. It was later revealed that Malta placed fourteenth out of the 19 participating countries in the semi-final with 38 points.

Background 

Prior to the 2008 Contest, Malta had participated in the Eurovision Song Contest twenty times since its first entry in 1971. Malta briefly competed in the Eurovision Song Contest in the 1970s before withdrawing for sixteen years. The country had, to this point, competed in every contest since returning in 1991. Malta's best placing in the contest thus far was second, which it achieved on two occasions: in 2002 with the song "7th Wonder" performed by Ira Losco and in the 2005 contest with the song "Angel" performed by Chiara. In the 2007 edition, Malta failed to qualify to the final with the song "Vertigo" performed by Olivia Lewis.

For the 2008 Contest, the Maltese national broadcaster, Public Broadcasting Services (PBS), broadcast the event within Malta and organised the selection process for the nation's entry. PBS confirmed their intentions to participate at it on 19 June 2007. Malta selected their entry consistently through a national final procedure, a method that was continued for their 2008 participation.

Before Eurovision

Malta Song for Europe 2008 
Malta Song for Europe 2008 was the national final format developed by PBS to select the Maltese entry for the Eurovision Song Contest 2008. The competition consisted of a semi-final and final held on 24 and 26 January 2008, respectively, at the Malta Fairs & Conventions Centre in Ta' Qali. Both shows were hosted by former Maltese Eurovision entrant Chiara who represented Malta in the 1998 and 2005, John Demanuele and Ruth Casingena and broadcast on Television Malta (TVM) as well on the website di-ve.com.

Format 
The competition consisted of seventeen songs competing in the semi-final on 24 January 2008 where the top eight entries qualified to compete in the final on 26 January 2008. Seven judges evaluated the songs during the shows and each judge had an equal stake in the final result. In the semi-final, the qualifying entries were the eight songs that received the highest scores from the judges. In the final, the results were based on the results of the public televote and the votes of five judges.

Competing entries 
Artists and composers were able to submit their entries between 12 and 13 November 2007. Both artists and songwriters were required to be Maltese or possess Maltese citizenship. Songwriters were able to submit as many songs as they wished, however, artists were only able to submit a maximum of two songs. 225 entries were received by the broadcaster. On 24 November 2007, a shortlist of 36 entries that had progressed through the selection process were announced on the TVM programme Il-Weekend Jibda Hawn. The seventeen songs selected to compete in the semi-final were announced in a press conference held at the Salesians Hall in Sliema on 9 January 2008.

Among the selected competing artists were former Maltese Eurovision entrants Mary Spiteri who represented Malta in the 1992 contest, and Chris and Moira who represented Malta in the 1994 contest. Among the songwriters, Ray Agius, Raymond Mahoney, Gerard James Borg and Philip Vella were all past writers of Maltese Eurovision entries. Paul Giordimaina represented Malta in the 1991 edition.

Shows

Semi-final
The semi-final took place on 24 January 2008. Seventeen songs competed for eight qualifying spots in the final. The running order for the semi-final was announced on 9 January 2008. The show was opened with a guest performance by the Boom Band and Ruth Casingena, while the interval act featured further performances by Ruth Casingena together with Chiara. The seven members of the jury that evaluated the entries during the semi-final consisted of:

 José Luis Ayllón (Spain) – Radio DJ
 José Juan Santana (Spain) – composer and singer
 Johnny Jørgensen (Denmark) – music teacher
 Horst Senker (Germany) – producer of the music department at Westdeutscher Rundfunk (WDR)
 Marios Anastasiou (Cyprus) – musician and music teacher
 Radim Smetana (Czech Republic) – music editor
 Aida Kurtović (Slovenia) – jounalist and music editor for Radio Val 202

Final 
The final took place on 26 January 2008. The eight entries that qualified from the semi-final were performed again and the votes of a five-member jury panel (20%) and the results of public televoting (80%) determined the winner. The show was opened with a guest performance of "Vertigo" and "Heaven" by the 2007 Maltese Eurovision entrant Olivia Lewis, while the interval act featured performances by Chiara, 1995 Maltese Eurovision entrant Mike Spiteri and Australian Idol 2007 winner Natalie Gauci. After the votes from the jury panel and televote were combined, "Vodka" performed by Morena was the winner. The five members of the jury that evaluated the entries during the final exclusively consisted of Maltese members: Joe Cutajar, Frederick Zammit, Eric Montfort, Robert Azzopardi and Christa Caruana.

Promotion 
Prior to the contest, Morena specifically promoted "Vodka" as the Maltese Eurovision entry on 25 April 2008 by performing during the UKEurovision Preview Party event which was held at the Scala venue in London, United Kingdom and hosted by Paddy O'Connell.

At Eurovision
The Eurovision Song Contest 2008 took place at the Belgrade Arena in Belgrade, Serbia and consisted of two semi-finals for the first time on 20 and 22 May, and the final of 24 May 2008. According to Eurovision rules, all nations with the exceptions of the host country and the "Big Four" (France, Germany, Spain and the United Kingdom) are required to qualify from one of two semi-finals in order to compete for the final; the top nine songs from each semi-final as determined by televoting progress to the final, and a tenth was determined by back-up juries. The European Broadcasting Union (EBU) split up the competing countries into six different pots based on voting patterns from previous contests, with countries with favourable voting histories put into the same pot. On 28 January 2008, a special allocation draw was held which placed each country into one of the two semi-finals. Malta was placed into the second semi-final, to be held on 22 May 2008. The running order for the semi-finals was decided through another draw on 17 March 2008 and Malta was set to perform in position 16, following the entry from Hungary and before the entry from Cyprus.

The two semi-finals and the final were broadcast in Malta on TVM with commentary by Eileen Montesin. The Maltese spokesperson, who announced the Maltese votes during the final, was Moira Delia.

Semi-final 

Morena took part in technical rehearsals on 14 and 18 May, followed by dress rehearsals on 21 and 22 May. The Maltese performance featured Morena wearing high-heeled long boots with small mirrors and a black outfit with silver and black glitter, designed by Maltese designer Ernest Camilleri, and performing together with four dancers. Morena was joined by a backing vocalist on stage: Anabelle Debono. The dancers featured during the performance were Dan Gill, Markus Englund, Nicklas Berglund and Thomas Benstem.

At the end of the show, Malta was not announced among the top 10 entries in the second semi-final and therefore failed to qualify to compete in the final. It was later revealed that Malta placed fourteenth in the semi-final, receiving a total of 38 points.

Voting 
Below is a breakdown of points awarded to Malta and awarded by Malta in the second semi-final and grand final of the contest. The nation awarded its 12 points to Switzerland in the semi-final and to Sweden in the final of the contest.

Points awarded to Malta

Points awarded by Malta

References

External links
 Malta at the Eurovision Song Contest
 Malta Council for Culture and the Arts

2008
Countries in the Eurovision Song Contest 2008
Eurovision